Southeast Asian studies (SEAS) refers to research and education on the language, culture, and history of the different states and ethnic groups of Southeast Asia. Some institutions refer to this discipline as ASEAN Studies since most of the countries that they study belong to the Association of Southeast Asian Nations or ASEAN. Definitions of what constitutes Southeast Asia differ between scholars, which blurs the boundaries between Southeast Asian studies and other regional studies like Oriental studies and post-colonial studies. Southeast Asian studies incorporates anthropology, religious studies, linguistics, and international relations.

Definitions of Southeast Asia 

The boundaries of Southeast Asia are contested due to historical, cultural, and linguistic similarities between some groups in Southeast Asia and neighboring regions like India and China. Many scholars of Southeast Asian studies rely on the Association of Southeast Asian Nations (ASEAN) to create a concrete list of nations that fit under the umbrella of Southeast Asia. As of 2016, members of ASEAN include Brunei Darussalam, Cambodia, Indonesia, Lao DPR, Malaysia, Myanmar, Philippines, Singapore, Thailand, and Vietnam.

History of the discipline

Before and During the Second World War 

While the term "Southeast Asia" was first used in connection with the present region by American priest and educator Howard Malcom in 1837, the region presently referred to as Southeast Asia was split between India and the Far East by anglophone scholars prior to the Second World War and de-emphasized as an area of study due to the presence of national interests in the region. Initial inquiries into the culture and traditions of Southeast Asia were primarily conducted by German and Austrian scholars who had greater access to the region because their home countries had no colonies in the region The strategic importance of numerous locales in Southeast Asia such as the Dutch East Indies and the Philippines during the Second World War attracted increased attention from the West. This newfound attention led to the establishment of Mountbatten's South-East Asia Commant (SEAC) in 1943, and the publication of the first map of Southeast Asia by the National Geographic society in 1944.

Postwar 

Immediately after the conclusion of the Second World War, the beginnings of the Cold War drew the attention of United States think tanks and intelligence organizations away from Southeast Asia. Events such as the 1949 Revolution in China and fear about the spread of communism re-centered much of the monetary focus on to China and the Soviet Union. This led to two results: while funding and the commitment of corporations to the area decreased, oversight also decreased; researchers in the West were free to pursue most avenues of interest without the objection of their sponsors.

In East Asia 

In Japan, Southeast Asian studies became a more concrete field of study in the period after Japanese colonization of the region during the Pacific War. The Center for Southeast Asian Studies at Kyoto University was founded in 1963, and The Japan Society for Southeast Asian History was founded in 1966 In the United States, the rise of communism in Vietnam and Laos brought Southeast Asian studies to the forefront of academia and politics. In Korea, academics began forming groups focusing on the region of Southeast Asia in the 1990s. In 1991, the Korean Association of Southeast Asian Studies (KASEAS). Southeast Asian studies in South Korea focuses mainly on Southeast Asia's relationship with other regions in Asia, trans-border migration within and outside Southeast Asia, and the spread of Korean Wave in the region.

Publication
Southeast Asian Studies is also the English name of the Japanese scholarly journal Tonan Ajia Kenkyu. The journal has been published since 1963 by the Center for Southeast Asian Studies at Kyoto University.

Programs by country
Universities that offer studies of Southeast Asia are listed by region:

Southeast Asia
Ateneo de Manila University
De la Salle University
Chulalongkorn University
Gadjah Mada University
Mahidol University International College
National University of Singapore
Silliman University
Thammasat University
University of Indonesia
University of Malaya
University of Asia and the Pacific
University of the Philippines Diliman
Walailak University
Kasetsart University
Chiang Mai University
Naresuan University
Khon Kaen University
Ho Chi Minh City Open University

East Asia
Beijing Foreign Studies University
Beijing International Studies University
City University of Hong Kong
Jinan University
Kyoto University
National Chi Nan University
National Sun Yat-sen University
Sogang University
Sophia University
Sun Yat-sen University
Tokyo University of Foreign Studies
Xiamen University

North America
Arizona State University
Columbia University
Cornell University
Indiana University Bloomington
Johns Hopkins University
Northern Illinois University
Ohio University
University of British Columbia
University of California, Berkeley
University of California, Los Angeles
University of California, Riverside
University of Hawai'i at Manoa
University of Illinois
University of Michigan
University of Pittsburgh
University of Toronto
University of Washington, Seattle
University of Wisconsin, Madison
Yale University

Europe
Lund University, Centre for East and South-East Asian Studies
Università degli Studi di Napoli "L'Orientale"
School of Oriental & African Studies (University of London)
University of Hull
Heidelberg University
 Contemporary Asian Studies - University of Amsterdam
 Southeast Asian Studies - Leiden University
 Southeast Asian Studies - Asia Africa Institute at Hamburg University
 Südostasienwissenschaft - University of Bonn
 Südostasienwissenschaften - Goethe University Frankfurt
 Humboldt-Universität zu Berlin

Oceania
The Australian National University
The University of Western Australia

See also
Journal of Southeast Asian Studies publisher: Cambridge University Press on behalf of the National University of Singapore.

References

External links
Southeast Asian Studies (journal), Kyoto University, Japan.

Library guides to Southeast Asian studies
 
 
 
 
 
 

 
Studies
Asian studies